Brett Gibbs is a powerlifter from New Zealand.  He was previously the International Powerlifting Federation world record holder in the classic (raw without knee wraps) 83 kg weight class.  He became the IPF junior classic world champion in 2014 and the classic world champion in 2015. In 2016, he finished second in the IPF world championships behind John Haack of the US.  In 2017, he finished second behind Anuar Ulan of Kazakhstan.  Then in 2018, he reclaimed the IPF classic world title with a world record 830.5 kg total (299 kg squat, 214 kg bench, 317.5 kg deadlift).  The 299 kg squat and 214 kg bench were also world records.
Finally in 2019, he lost out to Russel Orhii.

References

External links 
 Brett Gibbs' Instagram account

Living people
New Zealand male weightlifters
Sportspeople from Masterton
New Zealand powerlifters
Year of birth missing (living people)
Male powerlifters